Golden Book Video was a line of children/family animated and live-action videos marketed by Western Publishing, beginning in the holiday season of 1985. They featured characters and stories from Western's print publications, such as Little Golden Books, and were originally released on VHS video cassette for under $10.

The videos made use of limited animation techniques to add motion to original illustrations from Western's print books; Western called this approach "bringing storybooks to life". As production was carried-out by multiple companies (usually Studio Consultants Inc., Universal Recording Corp. and Animagination Inc., among others), contents of the videos varies. Typically, they featured a full voice cast, with background music sourced from production music libraries (the APM Music library, in most cases), although original songs were recorded for some videos, occasionally with sing-along lyrics appearing on-screen. The video adaptions often carried original material that was not present in the original books. Some of their video releases were mastered with Dolby Stereo.

Beginning in 1986, Golden also began releasing Golden Book Music Videos, which usually contained similar limited animation set to new illustrations and a full-length story incorporating a combination of classic children's songs and new original songs. Golden Book Video also started the Golden Step-Ahead Video series, featuring educational videos dealing with subjects such as simple reading/letter phonics, basic mathematics, what going to school is like, etc.

In 1987, Golden Book Video started straying away from book adaptations, and began releasing general entertainment (i.e. cartoon episodes, TV specials, etc.) under their then-new "GoldenVision" banner, along with some newly created content (usually live-action), but by 1990, the GoldenVision banner was dropped and all new products, including general entertainment productions, were released under the regular Golden Book Video branding.

Also starting in 1989, many of the earlier "storybook adaptation" videos were reissued under the "Golden Book Video Classics" banner, which often would have the same famous golden spine on the sides of the box similar to Little Golden Books. Beginning in 1991, Golden Book Video also began releasing several older CBS after-school special cartoons produced by Bosustow Entertainment under this banner.

By 1996, Golden Book Video was absorbed into its parent company's Golden Books Family Entertainment division, and in 1993, Sony Wonder would then distribute VHS and DVD tapes of Western Publishing properties afterwards.

Random House and Classic Media (now DreamWorks Classics) bought out Golden Books Family Entertainment in 2001.

VHS Releases

 The Rainy Day Number Show
 The Poky Little Puppy and the Patchwork Blanket and Other Stories (The Sailor Dog  and Little Toad to the Rescue)
 Three Favorite Stories (Scuffy the Tugboat, What Was That? and Thoedore Mouse Goes to Sea)
 Richard Scarry and Other Nursery Stories (The Gingerbread Man and Other Nursery Tales (Goldilocks and the Three Bears and The Three Little Pigs)
 Three Amye Rosenberg Stories (The Tale of Peter Rabbit, Polly's Pet and The Little Red Hen)
 Three Mercer Mayer Stories (Herbert the Timid Dragon, Just For You and How the Trollusk Got his Hat)
 Whatever Happened to the Dinosaurs?
 Jungle Animal Tales (The Saggy Baggy Elephant, Tawny Scrawny Lion and Rupert the Rhinoceros)
 Three Sesame Street Stories (Everyone Makes Mistakes, The City Worm and the Country Worm and Wanted:The Great Cookie Thief)
 Five Sesame Street Stories (The Origins of Super-Grover, Super-Grover and the Speeding Sled, Super-Grover and the Three Bears, Suoer-Grover and the Hole Story or Gone Fishing and Big Bird Brings Spring to Sesame Street)
 The Three Little Pigs Sing a Gig
 Goldilocks and the Three Bears Sing Their Little Bitty Hearts Out
 The Hugga Bunch Stories
 Pound Puppies Stories Volume 1: The Gate Crashers, Snowball the Wonder Dog, and the Puppy Who Couldn't Remember.
 Pound Puppies Stories Volume 2: The Newborns at Camp O-Kay-Boney, A Prince of a Pup and Three Homes for Two Puppies
 Masters of the Universe Stories
 Richard Scarry's Old MacDonald's Farm and Other Stories (The Wolf and the Kids and The Musicians of Breman)
 Richard Scarry's Get Ready for School
 Working With Words and Numbers
 Alexander and the Terrible, Horrible, No Good, Very Bad Day
 Mike Mulligan and his Steam Shovel
 Fairy Tale Classics (Jack and the Beanstalk, Little Red Riding Hood and The Three Billy Goats Gruff)
 The Ugly Duckling and Other Treasured Tales (The Emperor's New Clothes and Thumbelina
 Cinderella and Other Stories (The Golden Goose and The Elves and the Shoemaker)
 Little Golden Book Land in The Great Harbor Rescue

References

External links
The Official "Little Golden Books" Page

Little Golden Books
Western Publishing
DreamWorks Classics
American children's films
Early childhood education